This article presents lists of historical events related to the writing of poetry during 2004. The historical context of events related to the writing of poetry in 2004 are addressed in articles such as History of Poetry Nationality words link to articles with information on the nation's poetry or literature (for instance, Irish or France).

Events

 April 1 — Foetry.com Web site is launched for the announced purpose of "Exposing fraudulent contests. Tracking the sycophants. Naming names." Members and visitors contribute information which links judges and prize winners in various poetry contests in attempts to document whether some contests have been rigged.
 February 16 — Edwin Morgan becomes Scotland's first ever official national poet, The Scots Makar, appointed by the Scottish Parliament.
 Jang Jin-sung defects from North Korea.
 Publication of remaining fragments of Sappho's Tithonus poem (6th/7th cent. BCE).
 Samizdat poetry magazine, founded in 1998, ceases publication.
 David and Helen Constantine relaunch Modern Poetry in Translation, a British journal focusing on the art of translating poetry. The magazine was founded in 1966 by Ted Hughes and Daniel Weissbort.

Works published
Listed by nation where the work was first published and again by the poet's native land, if different; substantially revised works listed separately:

Australia

 Robert Adamson Reading the River: Selected Poems
 Alison Croggon, November Burning, Vagabond
 M. T. C. Cronin, 
 Luke Davies,  Totem
 Sarah Day, The Ship, winner of the 2005 Arts Queensland Judith Wright Calanthe Award; Blackheath, N.S.W.: Brandl & Schlesinger
 Noel Rowe, Next to Nothing
 Dipti Saravanamuttu, The Colosseum
 Samuel Wagan Watson, Smoke Encrypted Whispers
 Les Wicks, Stories of the Feet, published by Five Islands

Anthologies in Australia
 Anthony Lawrence, editor, The Best Australian Poetry 2004, Publisher: UQP
 Les Murray, editor, The Best Australian Poems 2004, Publisher: Black Inc.

Canada
 Robert Archambeau, Home and Variations (Salt)
 Roo Borson, Short Journey Upriver Toward Oishida, winner of the 2004 Governor General's Award, the 2005 Griffin Poetry Prize and the 2005 Pat Lowther Award, American-Canadian
 Jon Paul Fiorentino, Hello Serotonin (Coach House Books) 
 Susan Holbrook, Good Egg Bad Seed
 Dennis Lee, So cool. Dennis Lee ; illustrations by Maryann Kovalski. Toronto : Key Porter.
 Don McKay, Camber, shortlisted for the 2005 Canadian Griffin Poetry Prize (Canada)
 Michael Ondaatje, Vintage Ondaatje, Vintage, 
 Ian Samuels, The Ubiquitous Big (Coach House Books) 
 Mark Truscott, Said Like Reeds or Things (Coach House Books) 
 Julia Williams, The Sink House (Coach House Books)

India, in English
 Meena Alexander, Raw Silk (Poetry in English), Evanston, Illinois: TriQuarterly Books/Northwestern University Press, by an Indian writing living in and published in the United States
 Ajeet Cour and Nirupama Dutt, editors, Our Voices: An Anthology of SAARC Poetry, in various languages, with some translations into English; New Delhi: Foundation of SAARC Writers and Literature
 Rukmini Bhaya Nair, Yellow Hibiscus: New and Selected Poems (Poetry in English), New Delhi: Penguin
 Kynpham Sing Nongkynrih and Robin Ngangom, editors, Anthology of Contemporary Poetry from the Northeast, Shillong: Nehu Publishing
 Jeet Thayil, English (Poetry in English), Penguin, Delhi and Rattapallax Press, New York, 2004. ; India, Indian poetry in English
 Mamang Dai, River Poems (Poetry in English), Kolkata: Writers Workshop

Ireland 
 Sebastian Barry, The Pinkening Boy: New Poems New Island New Poetry,
 Dermot Bolger, The Chosen Moment
 Ciarán Carson: The Midnight Court, (translation of Brian Merriman's Cúirt an Mhéan Oíche Gallery Press, 2005; Wake Forest University Press
 Peter Fallon, translator, The Georgics of Virgil, Oldcastle: The Gallery Press, 
 Vona Groarke, Flight and Earlier Poems, Wake Forest University Press, Winston-Salem Irish poet published in the U.S.
 Michael D. Higgins, An Arid Season
 William Wall, Fahrenheit Says Nothing To Me, Dedalus Press, Dublin

New Zealand
 Diane Brown, Learning to Lie Together, Godwit
 Paula Green, Crosswind, Auckland University Press
 Mark Pirie, Ron Riddell and Saray Torres, editors, The 2nd Wellington International Poetry Festival Anthology, Wellington: HeadworX
 Kendrick Smithyman, Campana to Montale, Writers Group
 Tusiata Avia, Wild Dogs Under My Skirt, Victoria University Press

Poets in Best New Zealand Poems

Poems from these 25 poets were selected by Robin Dudding for Best New Zealand Poems 2003, published online this year:

David Beach
Peter Bland
Jenny Bornholdt
Kate Camp
Gordon Challis
Geoff Cochrane
Fiona Farrell
Cliff Fell
Sia Figiel
Rhian Gallagher
Robin Hyde
Kevin Ireland
Anna Jackson
Anne Kennedy
Graham Lindsay
Anna Livesey
Karlo Mila
James Norcliffe
Gregory O'Brien
Bob Orr
Chris Price
Sarah Quigley
Elizabeth Smither
Brian Turner
Richard von Sturmer

United Kingdom
 Carol Ann Duffy, New Selected Poems Picador
 Paul Henry, The Breath of Sleeping Boys & other poems, Carreg Gwalch
 Muriel Spark, All the Poems

Anthologies in the United Kingdom
 Carol Ann Duffy:
 Out of Fashion: An Anthology of Poems, editor (contemporary poets select their favourite poem, from another time or culture, in connection with clothing), Faber and Faber
 Overheard on a Saltmarsh: Poets' Favourite Poems (editor) (30 contemporary poets selected their favourite children's poem to appear alongside one of their own poems; including contemporary poems by Sophie Hannah, Jackie Kay, Valerie Bloom, and Wendy Cope, as well as classic poets such as Robert Burns, John Betjeman and Edward Lear) Macmillan
 Don Paterson and Charles Simic, editors, New British Poetry

United States
 Kim Addonizio, What is this Thing Called Love (Norton)
 Meena Alexander, Raw Silk, Evanston, Illinois: TriQuarterly Books/Northwestern University Press, by an Indian writing living in and published in the United States
 John Ash, To the City (Talisman), 
 Wendell Berry, Given: Poems (Shoemaker & Hoard)
 Sophie Cabot Black, The Descent: poetry (Graywolf Press), 
 Charles Bukowski, Slouching Toward Nirvana: New Poems (Ecco)
 Tina Chang, Half-Lit Houses, Four Way Books
 Billy Corgan, Blinking with Fists, Faber and Faber
 Rita Dove, American Smooth: Poems (Norton); a New York Times "notable book of the year"
 Claudia Emerson, Late Wife (Louisiana State University Press)
 Alice Fulton, Cascade Experiment: Selected Poems (Norton)
 Sarah Gambito, Matadora (Alice James Book), 
 Jack Gilbert, Refusing Heaven (Alfred A. Knopf)
 Vona Groarke, Flight and Earlier Poems, Wake Forest University Press, Winston-Salem Irish poet published in the U.S.
 Beth Gylys, Spot in the Dark (Ohio State University Press), winner of The OSU Press/The Journal Award in Poetry
 Lee Harwood, Collected Poems
 Allison Hedge Coke – Rock, Ghost, Willow, Deer (memoir of poet's life)
 Fanny Howe, On the Ground
 Donald Justice, Collected Poems (Knopf); published posthumously; a New York Times "notable book of the year"
 Jane Kenyon, Jane Kenyon: Collected Poems (Graywolf Press), posthumous
 Ted Kooser, Flying At Night: Poems 1965–1985 (University of Pittsburgh Press)
 W. S. Merwin:
 Migration: New and Selected Poems (Copper Canyon Press)
 Present Company
 Mirabai, Mirabai: Ecstatic Poems translated into English by Robert Bly and Jane Hirshfield
 Eugenio Montale, Selected Poems, translated by Jonathan Galassi, Charles Wright, and David Young from the original Italian; Oberlin College Press, 
 Mary Oliver:
 New and Selected Poems, volume two
 Why I Wake Early: New Poems
 Blue Iris: Poems and Essays
 Long Life: Essays and Other Writings
 Carl Phillips, The Rest of Love, New York: Farrar, Straus and Giroux
 Kay Ryan, The Niagara River (Grove Press) 
 Michael Ryan, New And Selected Poems
 Mark Strand, Keeping Things Whole, by a Canadian native long living in and published in the United States
 Tony Tost, Invisible Bride (LSU) (selected by C.D. Wright for the 2003 Walt Whitman Award)
 Derek Walcott, The Prodigal (Farrar, Straus & Giroux); a New York Times "notable book of the year"
 Rosmarie Waldrop, Blindsight (New Directions)
 Franz Wright, Walking to Martha's Vineyard (Knopf) (Pulitzer Prize in Poetry)
 Jesse Lee Kercheval, Dog Angel

Criticism, scholarship and biography in the United States
 Anne Waldman and Lisa Birman, editors, Civil Disobediences: Poetics and Politics in Action, essays (Coffee House Press)

Anthologies in the United States
 Mary Ann Caws, editor, Yale Anthology of Twentieth-Century French Poetry, (Yale University Press), Apollinaire and more than 100 other poets, bi-lingual

Poets in The Best American Poetry 2004
The 75 poets included in The Best American Poetry 2004, edited by David Lehman, co-edited this year by Lyn Hejinian:

Kim Addonizio
Will Alexander
Bruce Andrews
Rae Armantrout
Craig Arnold
John Ashbery
Mary Jo Bang
Alan Bernheimer
Charles Bernstein
Anselm Berrigan
Mark Bibbins
Oni Buchanan
Michael Burkard
Anne Carson
T.J. Clark
Billy Collins
Jack Collom
Michael Costello
Michael Davidson
Olena Kalytiak Davis
Jean Day
Rita Dove
Rachel Blau DuPlessis
kari edwards
Kenward Elmslie
Aaron Fogel
Ariel Greenberg
Ted Greenwald
Barbara Guest
Carla Harryman
Jane Hirshfield
John Hollander
Fanny Howe
Kenneth Irby
Major Jackson
Marc Jaffee
Kenneth Koch
John Koethe
Yusef Komunyakaa
Sean Manzano Labrador
Ann Lauterbach
Nathaniel Mackey
Harry Mathews
Steve McCaffery
K. Silem Mohammad
Erín Moure
Paul Muldoon
Eileen Myles
Alice Notley
Jeni Olin
Danielle Pafunda
Heidi Peppermint
Bob Perelman
Carl Phillips
Robert Pinsky
Carl Rakosi
Ed Roberson
Kit Robinson
Carly Sachs
Jennifer Scappettone
Frederick Seidel
David Shapiro
Ron Silliman
Bruce Smith
Brian Kim Stefans
Gerald Stern
Virgil Suarez
Arthur Sze
James Tate
Edwin Torres
Rodrigo Toscano
Paul Violi
David Wagoner
Charles Wright

Elsewhere
 Stratis Haviaras translator into English from the original Modern Greek, C.P. Cavafy, The Canon, (Athens: Hermes Publishing; reprinted by Harvard University Press in 2007), published in Greece

Works published in other languages

French language

France
 Seyhmus Dagtekin, La langue mordue, Publisher: Le Castor Astral; Turkish poet writing in and published in French
 Linda Maria Baros, Le Livre de signes et d’ombres, Publisher: Éditions Cheyne
 Jean Max Tixier:
 Editor, La Poésie française contemporaine, anthology, publisher: Cogito
 Editor, Joyaux au sud / Juvaere din sud, traduit du roumain, anthology, publisher: Cogito
 Le temps des mots, publisher: Pluie d'étoiles éditions

Canada, in French
 Denise Desautels, editor, Mémoires parallèles, choix et présentation de Paul Chamberland, Montréal, Le Noroît (anthology)

India
In each section, listed in alphabetical order by first name:

Malayalam
 K. Satchidanandan, Sakshyangal, ("Witness")
 P. P. Ramachandran, Randay Murichathu, Thrissur: Current Books
 Raghavan Atholi, Maunasilakalude Pranayakkurippukal, Calicut: Avvaiyar Books

Other in India
 Ajeet Cour and Nirupama Dutt, editors, Our Voices: An Anthology of SAARC Poetry, in various languages, with some translations into English; New Delhi: Foundation of SAARC Writers and Literature
 Jiban Narah, Suna mor Phul Koli, Guwahati, Assam: Banlata; Indian, Assamese-language
 Malathi Maithri, Viduthalaiyai Ezhuthuthal ("Writing Liberation"), Nagercoil: Kalachuvadu Pathippagam; Tamil-language
 Natyanubhava, Bikaner: Vagdevi Prakashan, anthology; Hindi-language
 Nirendranath Chakravarti, Mayabi Bondhon, Kolkata: Dey's Publishing; Bengali-language
 Sachin Ketkar, Bhintishivaicya Khidkitun Dokavtana, Mumbai: Abhidhanantar Prakashan; Marathi-language
 Tarannum Riyaz, editor, Biswin Sadi Mein Khwateen ka Urdu Adab ("Anthology of Twentieth Century Women's Writing in Urdu"), poetry, fiction and nonfiction anthology; New Delhi: Sahitya Akademi, ; Urdu-language
 Srijato, Udanta Sawb Joker ("All Those Flying Jokers"), Bengali-language
 Veerankutty, Manthrikan ("Wizard"), Kottayam: DC Books; Malayalam-language

Poland
 Julia Hartwig, Bez pozegnania ("No Farewells"), 96 pages; Warsaw: Sic! 
 Ryszard Krynicki, Kamień, szron ("Stone, Rime"); Kraków: Wydawnictwo a5
 Ewa Lipska, Gdzie indziej, ("Somewhere else"); Kraków: Wydawnictwo literackie
 Tadeusz Różewicz, Wyjście ("Exit"), Wrocław: Wydawnictwo Dolnośląskie
 Tomasz Różycki:
 Dwanaście stacji ("Twelve Stations"), a book-length poem, awarded the 2004 Kościelski Prize; Kraków: Znak
 Wiersze, containing all the poems from Różycki's first four poetry books, Warsaw: Lampa i Iskra Boża

Other languages
 Christoph Buchwald, general editor, and Michael Lentz, guest editor, Jahrbuch der Lyrik 2005 ("Poetry Yearbook 2005"), publisher: Beck; anthology; Germany
 Klaus Høeck, Hsieh, publisher: Gyldendal; Denmark
 Rahman Henry, Aundhokarbela, publisher: BALAKA, Chittagong. Bangladesh
 Tomas Tranströmer, The Great Enigma (Den stora gåtan), publisher: Albert Bonniers förlag; Sweden

Awards and honors

Australia
 ALS Gold Medal: Laurie Duggan, Mangroves, University of Queensland Press
 C. J. Dennis Prize for Poetry: Judith Beveridge, Wolf Notes
 Dinny O'Hearn Poetry Prize: Totem by Luke Davies
 Grace Leven Prize for Poetry: Luke Davies, Totem, Allen & Unwin
 Kenneth Slessor Prize for Poetry: Pam Brown, Dear Deliria: New & Selected Poems
 Mary Gilmore Prize: David McCooey, Blister Pack; Michael Brennan, Imageless World

Canada
 Gerald Lampert Award: Adam Getty, Reconciliation
 Archibald Lampman Award: David O'Meara, The Vicinity
 Atlantic Poetry Prize: Brian Bartlett, Wanting the Day
 Canadian Parliamentary Poet Laureate: Pauline Michel (until 2006)
 Governor General's Awards: Roo Borson, Short Journey Upriver Toward Oishida (English); André Brochu, Les jours à vif (French)
 Griffin Poetry Prize Canadian: Anne Simpson, Loop
 Griffin Poetry Prize International, in the English Language: August Kleinzahler, The Strange Hours Travelers Keep
 Pat Lowther Award: Betsy Struthers, Still
 Prix Alain-Grandbois: Jean-Philippe Bergeron, Visages de l'affolement
 Dorothy Livesay Poetry Prize: Philip Kevin Paul, Taking the Names Down from the Hill
 Prix Émile-Nelligan: Kim Doré, Le rayonnement des corps noirs

New Zealand
 Prime Minister's Awards for Literary Achievement:
 Montana New Zealand Book Awards First-book award for poetry: Cliff Fell, The Adulterer's Bible, Victoria University Press

United Kingdom
 Cholmondeley Award: John Agard, Ruth Padel Lawrence Sail, Eva Salzman
 Eric Gregory Award: Nick Laird, Elizabeth Manuel, Abi Curtis, Sophie Levy, Saradha Soobrayen
 Forward Poetry Prize Best Collection: Kathleen Jamie, The Tree House (Picador)
 Forward Poetry Prize Best First Collection: Leontia Flynn, These Days (Jonathan Cape)
 Scots Makar (equivalent of a poet laureate to represent and promote poetry in Scotland) named on February 16: Edwin Morgan
 Orange Prize for Fiction: Andrea Levy, Small Island
 Queen's Gold Medal for Poetry: Hugo Williams
 T. S. Eliot Prize (United Kingdom and Ireland): George Szirtes, Reel
 Whitbread Award for poetry: Michael Symmons Roberts, "Corpus"

United States
 Aiken Taylor Award for Modern American Poetry, Henry Taylor
 Agnes Lynch Starrett Poetry Prize awarded to Aaron Smith for Blue on Blue Ground
 AML Award for poetry to John Talbot for The Well-Tempered Tantrum
 Andrés Montoya Poetry Prize awarded to Sheryl Luna for Pity the Drowned Horses
 Bernard F. Connors Prize for Poetry, Jeremy Glazier, "Conversations with the Sidereal Messenger"
 Bobbitt National Prize for Poetry, B.H. Fairchild for Early Occult Memory Systems of the Lower Midwest
 Brittingham Prize in Poetry, John Brehm, Sea of Faith
 Frost Medal: Richard Howard
 MacArthur Fellowship: C.D. Wright
 National Book Award for poetry: Jean Valentine, Door in the Mountain: New and Collected Poems, 1965–2003
 Poet Laureate Consultant in Poetry to the Library of Congress: Ted Kooser appointed
 Poet Laureate of Virginia: Rita Dove, two year appointment 2004 to 2006
 Pulitzer Prize for poetry: Franz Wright, Walking to Martha's Vineyard
 Robert Fitzgerald Prosody Award: Timothy Steele
 Ruth Lilly Poetry Prize: Kay Ryan
 Wallace Stevens Award: Mark Strand
 Whiting Awards: Catherine Barnett, Dan Chiasson, A. Van Jordan
 William Carlos Williams Award: Anthony Butts, Little Low Heaven, Judge: Lucie Brock-Broido
 Fellowship of the Academy of American Poets: Jane Hirshfield

Awards and honors in other nations
 One of Pakistan's highest civilian honors, the Hilal-e-Imtiaz, awarded to Ahmed Faraz, an Urdu-language poet, for his literary achievements

Deaths
Birth years link to the corresponding "[year] in poetry" article:
 January 4 – Jeff Nuttall, 70 (born 1933), English poet, publisher, actor, painter, sculptor, jazz trumpeter, and social commentator
 January 8 – Norman Talbot (born 1936), Australian
 January 29 – Janet Frame, 79, English novelist who wrote poetry all her life; she published one collection, The Pocket Mirror, in 1967.
 February 17 – Bruce Beaver (born 1928), Australian
 March 3 – Pedro Pietri 59, Puerto Rican/American poet
 March 12 – Cid Corman, 79, American poet, translator and editor
 August 29 – Donald Allen, influential editor, publisher, and translator of contemporary American literature who edited The New American Poetry 1945-1960, an influential book republished in 1990.
 September 16 – Virginia Hamilton Adair, 91, American poet
 October 20 – Anthony Hecht, American poet
 December 2 – Mona Van Duyn (born 1921), American poet
 December 8 – Jackson Mac Low, American poet
 December 26 – Ishigaki Rin 石垣りん (born 1920), Japanese poet, employee of the Industrial Bank of Japan, sometimes called "the bank teller poet"
 date not known – Mary Elizabeth Frye (born 1905), American housewife, florist, author of the poem "Do not stand at my grave and weep"

See also

Poetry
List of poetry awards

References

Notes
"A Timeline of English Poetry" Web page of the Representative Poetry Online Web site, University of Toronto

2000s in poetry

Poetry